Trojanów may refer to the following places:
Trojanów, Łódź Voivodeship (central Poland)
Trojanów, Lublin Voivodeship (east Poland)
Trojanów, Garwolin County in Masovian Voivodeship (east-central Poland)
Trojanów, Mińsk County in Masovian Voivodeship (east-central Poland)
Trojanów, Greater Poland Voivodeship (west-central Poland)